Shakhen (also Romanized as Shākhen and Shākhīn) is a village in Shakhen Rural District of Shakhenat District, Birjand County, South Khorasan province, Iran. At the 2006 National Census, its population was 1,468 in 397 households, when it was in the Central District. The following census in 2011 counted 1,226 people in 406 households. The latest census in 2016 showed a population of 1,342 people in 422 households; it was the largest village in its rural district. After the census, Shakhen Rural District and Shakhenat Rural District were separated from the Central District to establish Shakhenat District.

References 

Birjand County

Populated places in South Khorasan Province

Populated places in Birjand County